Sikandar Khel Bala is a town and union council in Bannu District of Khyber-Pakhtunkhwa.

References

Union councils of Bannu District
Populated places in Bannu District